Vesca (in older sources also Vesce),  is a small settlement in the Municipality of Vodice in the Upper Carniola region of Slovenia. It lies in the middle of the Skaručna Basin.

Notable people
Notable people that were born or lived in Vesca include:
Matija Koželj (1842–1917), painter

References

External links
Vesca on Geopedia

Populated places in the Municipality of Vodice